Rock Dam Lake is an  lake located in Clark County, Wisconsin.  The lake is shallow, with the deepest depth at 10 feet.  It is rich in iron resulting in a dark red-blue hue.

Activities
Across the street from the lake is the main Rock Dam camping ground. Various homes and cabins are often available for rent year round. Summer activities include camping, swimming, water skiing, jet skiing, and off-road vehicle trails (four-wheelers, dirt bikes). Winter activities include ice fishing and snowmobiling.

Sources
Wisconsin DNR
UW Stevens Point

Lakes of Wisconsin
Bodies of water of Clark County, Wisconsin